Black Girl in Paris is a novel written by American author Shay Youngblood, originally published in 2000 by Riverhead Books, then reprinted in 2013 by Blue Cloud Press.

The novel follows Eden Daniels, a black American woman in her mid-20s, who longs to be a writer and escapes to Paris in the mid-1980s.

In 2013 the novel was adapted into a short film of the same name directed by Kiandra Parks and starring Zaraah Abrahams.

Plot
In 1986 Eden Daniels, a 26 year old African-American woman decides to move to Paris to follow in the steps of other artists she's admired and try to become a writer.

Eden arrives in Paris when a wave of terrorism sparks an anti-immigrant backlash. Nevertheless, she is able to find work in the ex-pat community and works as an artist's model, an au-pair and a poet's assistant. As she scrapes by Eden dreams of encountering one of her literary heroes, James Baldwin who still lives in Paris and who many of her employers have had brief encounters with.

Eden falls in love with Ving, a white American jazz musician, but their relationship is complicated as they still face prejudice for being an interracial couple. When the family where Eden works as an au-pair leaves for the U.S. and Ving leaves around the same time to visit his ailing mother, Eden is left friendless and penniless. She befriends Luce, a Haitian born woman living in Paris who teaches Eden how to steal in order to survive.

Luce leaves Paris and Ving returns, sending Eden to his friends near Saint-Paul-de-Vence, where James Baldwin has an estate. Eden tries to meet him but learns he has returned to Paris. Heartbroken she finally begins to write her story down.

On Eden's last day in Paris she runs into Baldwin leaving a café. He greets her briefly before leaving.

Reception
The novel had a mixed reception. Salon called Youngblood a lyricist but criticized her for "clichéd bohemian characters". Publishers Weekly called it "a bold if sometimes self-indulgent memoir-style account of an aspiring writer".

References

2000 novels
African-American diaspora in Paris
African-American novels
Fiction set in 1986
Novels set in Paris
Novels with bisexual themes
Travel novels